USS Nipmuc (ATF-157) was an Abnaki-class of fleet ocean tug that served in World War II. The tug was sold to Venezuela in 1978.

References

 

Abnaki-class tugs
1945 ships
Ships built in Charleston, South Carolina
Abnaki-class tugs of the Bolivarian Navy of Venezuela